Kusunda Area is one of the 12 operational areas of BCCL located in Dhanbad Sadar subdivision of Dhanbad district in the state of Jharkhand, India.

Overview
Fire and subsidence in the Jharia coalfield are a legacy of its century old history. The danger of subsidence is enhanced by small workings and multi-section developments at shallow depths. Corrective measures have been and are being taken. There are many towns, villages, jores, roads and railways in the area. The danger of active fires is also there in some collieries.

Geography

Location
The Kusnda Area is located 4 km away from Dhanbad Junction railway station.

The map alongside shows some of the collieries in the Area. However, as the collieries do not have individual pages, there are no links in the full screen map. In the map placed further down, all places marked in the map are linked in the larger full screen map.

Collieries
Collieries in the Kusunda Area are: Baseria colliery, East Baseria colliery, Gondudih Khas Kusunda colliery, Godhar colliery, Kusunda colliery, Dhansar colliery and Industry colliery.

Mining plan
An overview of the proposed mining activity plan in Cluster VI, a group of 4 mines in the Kusunda Area, as of 2012, is as follows:

1. East Bassuriya colliery, with an open cast mine, has a normative production capacity of 1.500 million tonnes per year and a peak production capacity of 1.950 million tonnes per year. It had an expected life of 10 years.

2. Bassuriya colliery, with an underground mine, has a normative production capacity of 0.120 million tonnes per year and a peak production capacity of 0.156 million tonnes per year. It had an expected life of over 30 years. 

3. Gondudih Khas Kusunda colliery, with an open cast mine, has a normative production capacity of 2.000 million tonnes per year and a peak production capacity of 2.600 million tonnes per year. It had an expected life of 25 years. 

4. Godhur colliery had both an open cast and an underground mine. The open cast mine has a normative production capacity of 2.000 million tonnes per year and a peak production capacity of 2.600 million tonnes per year. It had an expected life of 18 years. The underground mine has a normative production capacity of 0.250 million tonnes per year and a peak production capacity of 0.325 million tonnes per year. It had an expected life of over 30 years. 

An overview of the proposed mining activity plan in Cluster VII, (only mines in the Kusunda Area  mentioned here), as of 2010, is as follows:

1.Dhansar colliery had both an open cast and an underground mine. The open cast mine has a normative production capacity of 0.8 million tonnes per year and a peak production capacity of 1.04 million tonnes per year. The underground mine has a normative production capacity of 0.372 million tonnes per year and a peak production capacity of 0.484 million tonnes per year.  

2.Kusunda colliery, with an open cast mine, has a normative production capacity of 2.000 million tonnes per year and a peak production capacity of 2.600 million tonnes per year.
3.Industry colliery – no production

Mine fire
Various parts of Baseria, Godhar, Industry, Khas Kusunda, Kusunda, Dhansar and East Baseria are affected by mine fire.

References

Coal mining operational areas in Jharkhand